The Vlaamse Druivenveldrit is a cyclo-cross race held in Overijse, Belgium. The race is organised by the VZW Sportvrienden Overijse and was first held in 1960. The race is regarded as a Cyclo-cross classic and has a difficult and dangerous parcours that often results in crashes.

History
Two members of the Overijse cycling club, Frans Vanhoey and Joris Bergiers, originally organized the event in 1960. Up until 1989 the race was usually held twice a year and was held three times in 1975. In addition the Belgian national cyclo-cross championships have been held on the course on five occasions in 1965, 1976, 1983, 1990 and 1996 and were organized by the same organizations. On two occasions a two-man cyclo-cross race or Koppelveldrit was also run on the same course and disputed by professional or elite cyclo-cross riders. In 1974, Roger De Vlaeminck and Frans Verbeeck won and in 1984 Adri van der Poel and Hennie Kuiper won. The 1984 Koppelveldrit was organised as a retirement race for Roger De Vlaeminck.

The event formed part of the Superprestige cyclocross series from the beginning of the Superprestige in 1983 until the 2001–2002 season. After that the Race was not part of a cyclo-cross classification competition. In the 2020–2021 season the race was the last race of the UCI Cyclo-cross World Cup.

The race has been won by many of the top cyclo-cross cyclists with multiple Cyclocross world champion Roland Liboton being the record holder in the event with 15 wins. Liboton is followed by the De Vlaeminck brothers, Eric and Roger who have nine and six wins each, as well as Sven Nys who also has six. In the 2005 edition, Bart Wellens kicked a spectator who was allegedly throwing beer at him. Wellens went on to win the event after Boom slipped in the final lap and initially was awarded the win despite the threat of disqualification. Several days later after a meeting of the three race commissionaires and the UCI, Wellens was disqualified and Boom was awarded the win.

Past winners

Women's winners

Winners when run as Belgian Cyclo Cross Championships

Notes

References

External links
Official website

Cyclo-cross races
Cycle races in Belgium
Recurring sporting events established in 1960
1960 establishments in Belgium
Overijse
Sport in Flemish Brabant